SZD may refer to:
 Schizoaffective disorder, a psychiatric diagnosis with symptoms of a mood disorder and schizophrenia
 Sheffield City Airport (IATA code)
 The Soviet Railways (Sovetskie Zheleznye Dorogi)
 A microcar made by SeAZ, SZ cycle-car series
 Szybowcowy Zakład Doświadczalny, a glider manufacturer in Poland
 Suzhou East railway station, China Railway pinyin code SZD